In igneous petrology, an intermediate composition refers to the chemical composition of a rock that has 5263 wt% SiO2 being an intermediate between felsic and mafic compositions. Typical intermediate rocks include andesite, dacite, and trachyandesite among volcanic rocks and diorite and granodiorite among plutonic rocks.

References

Geochemistry
Igneous rocks
Intermediate rocks